Race Imboden (born April 17, 1993) is an American left-handed foil fencer. Imboden is a nine-time team Pan American champion, six-time individual Pan American champion and 2019 team world champion. A three-time Olympian, Imboden is a two-time team Olympic bronze medalist. Imboden competed in the 2012 London Olympic Games, the 2016 Rio de Janeiro Olympic Games, and the 2021 Tokyo Olympic Games.

In addition to his fencing career, Imboden is also a menswear fashion model.

Personal life
Imboden was born in Tampa, Florida. His parents gave him his name after the Jonny Quest character Race Bannon. He moved to Atlanta at a young age. His first sports were inline skating and BMX; an inline skating accident left him with a crooked nose and a scar on his lip. He was playing with a toy sword in a park when a stranger suggested to his parents that he take up fencing. Shortly afterwards his family moved to Park Slope, Brooklyn, New York City.

Imboden joined the Fencer's Club in Manhattan, where he first met Jed Dupree and Dan Kellner, both of whom were foil fencing Olympians at the 2004 Summer Olympics.  They worked with him as a student, and Imboden made several connections. One lasting connection was that of the friendship to his long-time colleague Declan MacPherson, who Imboden notably gave an autograph to upon their first meeting. Imboden was educated at the Dwight School, which supported his budding sports career. His debut international competition came at age 14 when he won a bronze medal in the cadet (U17) 2010 world fencing championships. After graduating high school in spring 2011 he reconsidered his earlier signed intent to immediately attend Notre Dame, and took a year to focus on his training. He became a member of the Brooklyn Bridge Fencing Club, in the DUMBO section of Brooklyn, with Dan Kellner as his coach. He finally opted for St. John's University in New York, because it is closer to his family and coach.

Imboden's other passion is hip hop. He interned at independent label Fool's Gold in 2012 and is a DJ in his spare time.

Imboden and French foil fencer Ysaora Thibus met at a party after the Rio de Janeiro Olympic Games and began dating shortly afterward. The couple became engaged at the Pigalle in Paris after the Tokyo Olympic Games.

Career

Imboden joined the national cadet (U17) team in 2010 and capped the year with the Cadet National Championship title. A year later, he was an individual titlist at the Senior National Championship in Portland, Oregon, and team foil titlist at the 2011 and 2012 Pan American Fencing Championships. At the age of 17, he made the senior national team for the 2011 World Championships in Catania. For his first participation to an event of this magnitude, he reached the quarter-finals after seeing off triple world titlist Peter Joppich, but lost to France's Victor Sintès.

At the beginning of the 2011–12 World Cup he stood on the World Cup podium for his bronze medal in the Challenge International de Paris. His good international results qualified him to the US national team to compete at the London 2012 Summer Olympics with the top-ranked team in the Americas zone. Seeded No. 4, he finished 9th after being eliminated in the table of 16 by Andrea Baldini of Italy. In the team event, No. 5 seeded USA prevailed over France, lost to Italy (who would win the gold medal), and a loss followed in the bronze medal match with Germany.

In 2013 Imboden won the gold medal at the 2013 Copa Villa La Habana, his first World Cup title, breaking a 14-year drought of US Foil World Cup titlists. He is now one of two US men's foil fencers to have won a World Cup competition. In June of the same year he won a silver medal in the Pan American fencing Championships in Cartagena after being defeated in the final by his teammate Gerek Meinhardt. At the 2013 World Fencing Championships in Budapest Imboden was defeated in the table of 16 by Ukraine's Rostyslav Hertsyk, who later earned a bronze medal. He took part in the team event for the United States, who lost the final to Italy and took the silver medal. Imboden finished 10th in the 2012–13 FIE world rankings.

Imboden began the 2013–14 season win a silver medal finish in the 2013 World Combat Games. He won his second USA Division-1 National Championship title in April 2014, defeating David Willette 15–6. He placed second in the SK Trophée in Seoul and third in the Prince Takamado World Cup. The World Championships in Kazan were a disappointment as Imboden was defeated in the table of 16 by teammate Gerek Meinhardt. In the team event, No.4 seed USA lost to eventual silver medallist China in the quarter-finals and finished fifth. Imboden finished the season world No.10 for the second time in a row.

In the 2014–15 season Imboden made the quarter-finals in the San Francisco World Cup and proceeded to win gold at the Prince Takamodo World Cup in Tokyo after overcoming Russia's Dmitry Rigin in the final. He posted a third place in the Trofeo Inalpi in Turin, Italy. In January 2015 he achieved a double gold at the Challenge International de Paris: he became the first American to win the individual event after defeating Italy's Daniele Garozzo, then earned a second gold medal in the team event after Team USA prevailed over Italy. Imboden then took a bronze medal in the Havana Grand Prix. In April he won the Master de Fleuret in Melun, prevailing over Ma Jianfei in the final. Two weeks later he earned the gold medal at the 2015 Pan American Championships in Santiago, his third individual Pan American title. The 2015 World Championships in Moscow proved a disappointment: Imboden was defeated in the table of 16 by Olympic champion Lei Sheng. In the team event, the United States lost to Italy in the quarter-finals and finished sixth after the placement rounds. Imboden did, however, ended the season World no.1, ten points ahead of newly crowned world champion Yuki Ota, thus becoming the first American male fencer to win the overall World Cup.

In the 2015–16 season Imboden achieved another double-gold haul at the Paris World Cup, becoming the first fencer since Benjamin Kleibrink in 2006–2007 to win back-to-back editions. Three podiums out of three World Cup competitions sealed the United States' qualification to the team event of the 2016 Summer Olympics in Rio de Janeiro, guaranteeing three American slots in the individual event. Despite a further bronze medal at the Havana Grand Prix and a no.4 world ranking, Imboden was overtaken in the US rankings and qualified to the Olympics only as an alternate for the team event.

At the 2019 Pan American Games in Lima, Peru, Imboden and teammates Gerek Meinhardt and Nick Itkin won gold medals for the US men's foil team.

Imboden again qualified as an alternate to represent the United States in fencing at the 2020 Olympics in Tokyo in 2021 where the US team won its second consecutive bronze medal in the team foil competition.

Pan-Am Games protest

Following the  U.S. men's foil team victory at the 2019 Pan American Games in Lima, Peru, which earned Imboden and teammates Gerek Meinhardt and Nick Itkin gold medals, Imboden knelt on one knee on the medal podium as the United States national anthem played. Meinhardt and Itkin stood. He stated in a post on Twitter that he had done so as a protest against racism, for gun control, mistreatment of immigrants, and the rhetoric of President Donald Trump. United States Olympic & Paralympic Committee spokesperson Mark Jones criticized Imboden, as all athletes are to commit to refraining from political actions and demonstrations, stating "In this case, Race didn’t adhere to the commitment he made to the organizing committee and the USOPC. We respect his rights to express his viewpoints, but we are disappointed that he chose not to honor his commitment." Imboden had previously mounted a similar protest with a teammate at a World Cup event in Egypt in 2017.

On 21 August 2019, Imboden was placed on a twelve-month probation by the U.S. Olympic and Paralympic Committee for his protest at the Pan American Games.

Modeling
He began modelling for Quest Models after being scouted by an agent during the London Olympics. In 2013 he made models.com's "hot list" of the most in-demand newcomers in the business. In 2015 he began working with Wilhelmina Models. He left school during his first year to concentrate on his modelling and international career, as under NCAA rules he could not take part in collegiate fencing while being paid to model.

Imboden is currently represented by The Society Management New York.

Medal Record

Olympic Games

World Championship

Pan American Championship

Grand Prix

World Cup

See also
List of USFA Division I National Champions

References

External links

Have Foil, Will Travel, Imboden's personal blog
Profile on USfencing.org
Profile on Models.com

American male foil fencers
Fencers at the 2012 Summer Olympics
Fencers at the 2016 Summer Olympics
Living people
Sportspeople from Tampa, Florida
1993 births
Sportspeople from Brooklyn
Olympic bronze medalists for the United States in fencing
Medalists at the 2016 Summer Olympics
Fencers at the 2019 Pan American Games
Pan American Games medalists in fencing
Pan American Games gold medalists for the United States
Pan American Games bronze medalists for the United States
Medalists at the 2019 Pan American Games
Fencers at the 2020 Summer Olympics
Medalists at the 2020 Summer Olympics